Paul-Andre Cadieux (born June 25, 1947) is a former professional ice hockey defenceman and later  Player-coach, coach and sports director. He is the father of ice hockey player Jan Cadieux.

Born in Ottawa, Ontario, Canada, Cadieux studied Sports science at the University of Ottawa and came to Switzerland to play for SC Bern in 1970. He stayed in the Swiss hockey scene ever since.

Achievements 

1974 - NLA Champion with SC Bern
1975 - NLA Champion with SC Bern
1977 - NLA Champion with SC Bern

External links 
 
 Cadieux on hockeyfans.ch
 Interview in French

1947 births
Canadian ice hockey coaches
Canadian ice hockey defencemen
Canadian emigrants to Switzerland
Canadian expatriate ice hockey players in Switzerland
ECH Chur players
Franco-Ontarian people
Genève-Servette HC players
HC Davos players
HC Fribourg-Gottéron players
Ice hockey people from Ottawa
Living people
Oshawa Generals players
SC Bern coaches
SC Bern players
SCL Tigers players
University of Ottawa alumni